The 2020 CONCACAF U-20 Championship was originally to be the 7th edition of the CONCACAF U-20 Championship (28th edition if all eras included), the biennial international youth football championship organised by CONCACAF for the under-20 national teams of the North, Central American and Caribbean region. The tournament was originally scheduled to be held in Honduras between 20 June and 5 July 2020. However, on 13 May 2020, CONCACAF announced the decision to postpone the tournament due to the COVID-19 pandemic, with the new dates of the tournament to be confirmed later.

The final tournament would feature 20 teams, using the same format as the 2019 CONCACAF U-17 Championship. The top four teams of the tournament would have qualified for the 2021 FIFA U-20 World Cup in Indonesia as the CONCACAF representatives. However, FIFA announced on 17 November 2020 that this edition of the World Cup would be cancelled. Following this announcement, CONCACAF decided on 4 January 2021 that the 2020 CONCACAF U-20 Championship, which served as the regional qualifiers, would be cancelled.

The United States were the defending champions.

Qualified teams

The format for qualification has changed since the 2016 edition (qualifying was not played in 2018). The qualifying competition no longer features Caribbean and Central American zones.

The 41 CONCACAF teams were ranked based on the CONCACAF Men's Under-20 Ranking as of June 2019. A total of 33 teams entered the tournament. The highest-ranked 16 entrants were exempt from qualifying and advanced directly to the group stage of the final tournament, while the lowest-ranked 17 entrants had to participate in qualifying, where the four group winners advanced to the round of 16 of the knockout stage of the final tournament.

Notes

Venues

Draw
The draw for the group stage took place on 20 November 2019, 11:00 EST (UTC−5), at the CONCACAF Headquarters in Miami. The 16 teams which entered the group stage were drawn into four groups of four teams. Based on the CONCACAF Under-20 Ranking, the 16 teams were distributed into four pots, with teams in Pot 1 assigned to each group prior to the draw, as follows:

Squads

Players born on or after 1 January 2001 are eligible to compete.

Group stage
The top three teams in each group advance to the round of 16, where they are joined by the four teams advancing from the qualifying round.

All times are local, CST (UTC−6).

Group A

Group B

Group C

Group D

Knockout stage

Bracket

Round of 16

Quarter-finals
Winners would have qualified for 2021 FIFA U-20 World Cup.

Semi-finals

Final

References

External links
Concacaf Under-20 Championship, CONCACAF.com

 
2020
U-20 Championship
2020 in youth association football
2021 FIFA U-20 World Cup qualification
International association football competitions hosted by Honduras
Association football events cancelled due to the COVID-19 pandemic